Limerick Racecourse (Greenmount Park) is a horse racing venue in County Limerick, Ireland, which stages both National Hunt and flat racing. The course opened in October 2001 and is the first purpose-built racecourse in Ireland in 50 years. The present location is the seventh different horse racing location in Limerick since 1790. In 1999, the course at Greenpark near Limerick city closed after 130 years of racing.

It is located on the M20 at exit 4,  outside the city.

Notable races

References

External links
Official website
Go Racing Profile
Racing Post Profile

 
Horse racing venues in the Republic of Ireland
Sports venues in County Limerick
Sports venues in Limerick (city)
Sports venues completed in 2001
21st-century architecture in the Republic of Ireland